The One World Singers was formed in  when the Denver Turnverein Chorus changed its name.

The chorus is under the leadership of director Dr. Keith Arnold with assistant directors Dr. Oliver Ellsworth and Anada Gusé. A. Dr. Arnold also directs the choir of Jefferson Unitarian Church.

Denver Turnverein Chorus
The Denver Turnverein Chorus changed its name to the One World Singers in 2010.

Denver Männerchor
The Denver Männerchor was one of the first male choruses in the Denver area. (Turnverein Centennial Journal 1865–1965)

That year a group of sixteen men, who wanted to foster the tradition of German male chorus singing and the fellowship that comes with it, established the Arion Gesangverein chorus. That chorus gave its first public concert in May 1937. In the mid-1990s Arion chorus changed its name to the Denver Männerchor, taking its name from one of the historic choruses.

Rocky Mountain Women's Chorus
In , the women permanently joined the Denver Männerchor to form the Denver Turnverein Chorus.

External links
 One World Singers- Home Page

Choirs in Colorado
Musical groups from Denver
Musical groups established in 2010
2010 establishments in Colorado